Aldworth is a village in Berkshire, England.

Aldworth may also refer to:
Aldworth Manor, summer estate house in Harrisville, New Hampshire
Aldworth (Blackdown), a house in Blackdown in the English county of Sussex built by Alfred Tennyson

People with the surname
Hannah Aldworth (died 1778), English philanthropist
Richard Aldworth (disambiguation) (several people)
Robert Aldworth (died 1634), English merchant and philanthropist
Robert Aldworth (MP) (c. 1624–1676), member of Parliament for Bristol and Devizes, England
Thomas Aldworth (fl. 1520–1577), mayor and member of parliament for Reading, England

See also
Alworth (disambiguation)